Whiddon Down is a hamlet within the parish of Drewsteignton in Devon.

Location
The hamlet lies on the old east–west A30 (London-Penzance) road, between Exeter and Okehampton at the cross-roads with the south–north route up to Bideford. The 'down' itself is a ridge of high farmland some 800 feet above sea level with commanding views. Recorded as Whyddon Doune in 1535 and as Whiddon Downe in 1661, it is named after its medieval landowners, the Whiddon family of nearby Chagford.

History
There have been scattered farms in the area since Saxon times, but the hamlet was only established with the turn-piking of the south–north road in the 18th century, when a  15th-century crossroads dwelling became a coaching inn and post point (The Post Inn). In the modern era, the village has long been well-served by buses due to its location. The dualling of this section of the A30 in the late 1980s means that the hamlet is  now bypassed by the A30 itself, but it remains a major road junction point, with a service station (Whiddon Down Service Area) and Travelodge.

Population growth in the 19th century was sufficient for the establishment of a small primary school in 1879 and a Methodist church in 1906. The school closed in 1959 and now serves as a village hall.  The community was expanded with council housing in the 1970s. There is a small number of agricultural businesses in the hamlet, and a caravan park, but there are no longer any shops apart from the nearby service station.

Chagstock music festival
Farmland on the south side of the hamlet provides the setting for the annual Chagstock music festival, held in July.

References

External links

 Post Inn web site
 Chagstock Music festival web site
 Drewsteignton Parish Council page for Whiddon Down, with photos

Dartmoor
Villages in Devon